Real Life is the debut album from contemporary Christian music singer Cindy Morgan.  It was jointly released in 1992 by Word Records (for the Christian market) and Epic Records (for the secular market). This set earned Morgan her first 6 Dove Award nominations, ultimately resulting in her first win, in the New Artist category. Two singles from this album were released to commercial radio: "Say It Again" and "Anytime At All."

Track listing
US/Canada:
 "Real Life" (Morgan, Grant Cunningham, Hammond) – 4:14
 "Say It Again" (Morgan, Tommy Greer, Hammond, Cunningham) – 3:39
 "Moment In Time" (Morgan, Hammond, Cunningham) – 4:09
 "Let It Be Love" (Morgan, Hammond) – 5:33
 "2 Hearts, 1 Love" (Morgan, Hammond, Cunningham) – 4:28
 "Free World" (Geoff Thurman, Marabeth Jordan) – 4:11
 "Its Gonna Be Heaven" (Cunningham, Hammond) – 4:07
 "Anytime At All" (Cunningham, Hammond) – 4:34
 "Love Could Break Your Fall" (Hammond, Cunningham) – 4:45
 "How Could I Ask For More" (Morgan) – 3:32

Personnel 
 Cindy Morgan – lead vocals, backing vocals (1-8)
 Mark Hammond – keyboard programming (1-9), bass and drum programming (1-9), backing vocals (1, 2, 3, 5, 6), BGV arrangements (4, 6, 7)
 Phil Naish – acoustic piano (10)
 Jerry McPherson – guitars (2, 4, 5, 6), electric guitar (9)
 Mark Baldwin – gut-string guitar (9)
 Mark Douthit – saxophone (8)
 Lisa Bevill – backing vocals (1, 2, 5), BGV arrangements (5)
 Joe Hogue – backing vocals (1, 5), BGV arrangements (5)
 Chris Rodriguez – backing vocals (2)
 Geoffrey Thurman – backing vocals (4, 6), BGV arrangements (4)
 Mervyn Warren – backing vocals (7), BGV arrangements (7)
 Grant Cunningham – BGV arrangements (7)

Choir on "Let It Be Love"
 Grant Cunningham, Celeste Hammond, Tina Hutchison, Michael Mellett, Scott Moore and Vicky Vaughn

Production 
 John Mays – executive producer 
 Mark Hammond – producer, arrangements 
 Ronnie Brookshire – recording, mixing 
 Todd Robbins – additional engineer, assistant engineer 
 Brian Lenthall – assistant engineer, production assistant 
 Tom Reeves – editing at West Park Sound (Nashville, Tennessee)
 Ken Love – mastering at MasterMix (Nashville, Tennessee)
 Mark Tucker – photography 
 Amy Linde – art direction 
 Tom Tufts – art direction, design 
 Alvaro Alacron – hair, make-up

References

1992 debut albums
Dance-pop albums by American artists
Cindy Morgan (singer) albums
Epic Records albums
Word Records albums